WEB Entertainment is a Detroit-based record label run by the Bass Brothers. It is best known for producing both of Eminem's independent albums, Infinite and the Slim Shady EP demo, before he signed to Interscope Records and Aftermath Entertainment.

WEB Entertainment has been credited on each one of Eminem's major-label albums up to The Marshall Mathers LP 2, and the Bass Brothers have continued to produce and co-produce most of his tracks up to The Eminem Show.

Detroit-based horrorcore artist King Gordy released his debut album titled The Entity, via WEB Entertainment in 2003. Same year, power-pop band The Romantics released their 61/49.

In 2010, WEB Entertainment released an EP by Detroit deaf rapper Sean Forbes called "I'm Deaf" in 2010 with a music video also called "I'm Deaf" which has received national praise from Mitch Albom in Parade Magazine.

Artists

Current
King Gordy
Sean Forbes

Former 
Eminem

Discography

See also
 List of record labels

References

External links
Official website

American record labels
Hip hop record labels